"Analogue (All I Want)" is a song by Norwegian band A-ha. It is the title track of their eighth studio album (2005). The song was released as a single on 30 December 2005 and became a top-10 hit in Norway and the United Kingdom.

Background and release
The song was re-written and re-recorded after it was first recorded. The original version of the song was titled "Minor Key Sonata (Analogue)", and (like the rest of the Analogue album) was produced by Martin Terefe and mixed by Flood. Max Martin was then brought in to turn "Minor Key Sonata (Analogue)" into a more radio-appropriate song, with less surreal lyrics and catchier chorus. The song was then retitled "Analogue (All I Want)" and is the only track on the album not produced by Terefe. Upon its release as a single, it became the band's first Top 10 hit in the UK since 1988.

Music video
The video, which was shot in black and white, was directed by Howard Greenhalgh.

Track listings
UK CD1
 "Analogue (All I Want)" (Album Version)
 "Case Closed on Silver Shore"

UK CD2
 "Analogue (All I Want)" (Album Version)
 "Minor Key Sonata (Analogue)"
 "Keeper of the Flame" (Live at Frognerparken)
 "Analogue (All I Want)" (Video)

German CD
 "Analogue (All I Want)" (Album Version) 3:48
 "Minor Key Sonata (Analogue)" 4:34
 "Analogue (All I Want)" (Live at Frognerparken) 5:02
 "Analogue (All I Want)" (Instrumental Version) 3:48
 "Case Closed on Silver Shore" 4:28
 "Analogue (All I Want)" (Video)

French CD
 "Analogue (All I Want)" (Album Version)
 "Case Closed on Silver Shore"

Charts

Release history

MTV Unplugged appearance 
In 2017, A-ha appeared on the television series MTV Unplugged and played and recorded acoustic versions of many of their popular songs for the album MTV Unplugged – Summer Solstice in Giske, Norway, including "Analogue (All I Want)".

References

A-ha songs
2005 singles
2005 songs
Black-and-white music videos
Music videos directed by Howard Greenhalgh
Polydor Records singles
Song recordings produced by Max Martin
Songs written by Magne Furuholmen
Songs written by Max Martin
Songs written by Paul Waaktaar-Savoy